Hebron is an unincorporated community in southeastern Douglas County, Missouri, United States. Hebron is located at the intersection of a county road with Hebron Hollow, which is a spring-fed tributary to the North Fork River to the southwest. Missouri Route 181 is approximately 3/4 mile to the east. Hebron Boat Access and campground is located on the North Fork, about two miles to the west on Missouri Route AA.

History
A post office called Hebron was established in 1905, and remained in operation until 1935. The community was named after the ancient city of Hebron.

References

Unincorporated communities in Douglas County, Missouri
1905 establishments in Missouri
Unincorporated communities in Missouri